Al-Ahli Club also known as Al Ahli Merowe is an association football club from Merowe, Sudan. They play in the top level of Sudanese professional football, the Sudan Premier League. Their home stadium is Merowe Stadium. In 2021, the club played in the CAF Conderation Cup for the first time in the club's history.

History 
In 2021, Al Ahli Merowe qualified for the 2021–22 CAF Confederation Cup after winning the 2021 Sudanese Cup. In their first round match against South Sudan club Atlabara, they won by 4–0 on aggregate. They however lost their second round match first leg match Kenyan club Gor Mahia by 3–1 and later withdrew from the competition, causing Gor Mahia to qualify to the next stage.

References

External links 

 Team profile – goalzz.com
 Al Ahli Club Merowe at Soccerway
 Al Ahli Club Merowe at Footballdatabase.eu
 Al Ahli Club Merowe at Global Sports Archive

Football clubs in Sudan
Association football clubs established in 1956
1956 establishments in Sudan